M. D. Parthasarathy (21 September 1910 – August 1963) was an Indian music composer and actor, who worked mainly in Tamil cinema.

Musician
Parthasarathy was a "Sangeetha Bhushanam" of Annamalai University. During his period at this university veterans like Ponniah Pillai (of the Thanjavur quartet family) and violinist and Sangeetha Kalanidhi T.S. Sabesa Iyer taught there. After completing his course in the early 1930s, Parthasarathy went to Chennai (Madras then). It was the time the Tamil talkie began to flourish. Most of the Talkies were produced with stories from the mythological epics. The actors came from the stage and from the Carnatic music world. Parthasarathy who was well trained in Carnatic music found a place easily in talkies.

Actor
Prominent stage actor and writer Vadivel Naicker spotted Parthasarathy when he was acting in a play of the amateur group of the veteran stage drama producer Pammal Sambandha Mudaliar. This led to Parthasarathy playing roles in films like Sakkubai (1934), Draupadi Vastrapaharanam (1934) and Srinivasa Kalyanam (this is the first Tamil film to be wholly made in Madras). But he is said to have come into his own with his interpretation of Hanuman in the film Garuda Garva Bhangam (1936).

Radio stint
Just when his cinematic career seemed to have hit a dead-end, Parthasarathy found work with Tiruchi Radio as a staff artiste. He is said to have been very popular as an actor in radio plays.

Later, after leaving the film industry for good, Parthasarathy joined AIR Bangalore

Music director
After a few years in radio, the film world beckoned him again. It was S. S. Vasan calling him to be in-house music director for the Gemini banner which would become a household name in a few years.

Death 
Parthasarathy died in August 1963 due to cancer.

Filmography

As actor
 Sakkubai (1934)
 Srinivasa Kalyanam (1934)
 Garuda Garvabhangham (1936)
 Sethu Bandhanam (1937)
 Dharmapuri Rahasiyam (alias Rajadrohi)

As music composer
 Madanakamarajan (1941)
 Nandanar (1942)
 Dasi Aparanji (1943)
 Kannamma En Kadhali (1945)
 Gnana Soundari (Gemini) (1948)
 Chandralekha (1948)
 Avvaiyar (1953)
 Nam Kuzhandai (1955)

References

1910 births
1963 deaths
Tamil film score composers
Male actors in Tamil cinema